Valka Municipality is a municipality in Vidzeme, Latvia. The municipality was formed in 2009 by merging Valka town, Ērģeme Parish, Kārķi Parish, Valka Parish, Vijciems Parish and Zvārtava Parish; the administrative centre being Valka. In 2016 it was announced that due to better welfare and higher salaries in neighbouring Estonia, over 10% of municipality's inhabitants have registered themselves as inhabitants of Valga County. The population in 2020 was 7,603.

Twin towns — sister cities

Valka is twinned with:

 Braslaw, Belarus
 Çamlıyayla, Turkey
 Durbuy, Belgium
 I'billin, Israel
 Kościelisko, Poland
 Kobylnica, Poland
 Kutaisi, Georgia
 Marijampolė, Lithuania
 Novoye Devyatkino, Russia
 Orimattila, Finland
 Östhammar, Sweden
 Tvrdošín, Slovakia
 Uusikaupunki, Finland
 Valga, Estonia
 Valga, Spain
 Weißenburg-Gunzenhausen, Germany

See also
Administrative divisions of Latvia

References

 
Municipalities of Latvia
Vidzeme